Hans Wassermann (born 1 September 1953) is a former international speedway rider from West Germany.

Speedway career 
Wassermann won a bronze medal at the Speedway World Pairs Championship in the 1977 Speedway World Pairs Championship. He has also reached the final of the Individual Speedway Long Track World Championship on three occasions in 1975, 1976 and 1977.

He rode in the top tier of British Speedway from 1977-1978, riding for Reading Racers.

World Final appearances

World Pairs Championship
 1977 -  Manchester, Hyde Road (with Egon Müller) - 3rd - 18pts
 1978 -  Chorzów, Silesian Stadium (with Georg Hack) - 6th - 13pts

References 

1953 births
Living people
German speedway riders
Reading Racers riders
People from Ostallgäu
Sportspeople from Swabia (Bavaria)